Gabriel José Urdaneta Rangel  (born 7 January 1976) is a retired Venezuelan footballer.

Club career
Urdaneta has played professional football for a number of clubs in Venezuela and Switzerland. He also holds Swiss nationality.

At the end of the 2010-2011 season, he announced his retirement.

International career
He made 77 appearances for the Venezuela national team between 1996 and 2005, making him the third most-capped player in Venezuelan international football as of March 2008.

International goals

|-
| 1. || May 19, 1999 || Reales Tamarindos, Portoviejo, Ecuador ||  || 0–1 || 0-2 || Friendly
|-
| 2. || May 19, 1999 || Reales Tamarindos, Portoviejo, Ecuador ||  || 0–2 || 0-2 || Friendly
|-
| 3. || July 7, 1999 || Antonio Oddone Sarubbi, Ciudad Del Este, Paraguay ||  || 3–1 || 3-1 || 1999 Copa América
|-
| 4. || August 10, 2000 || Alejandro Morera Soto, Alajuela, Costa Rica ||  || 1–1 || 1-5 || Friendly
|-
| 5. || August 10, 2000 || Alejandro Morera Soto, Alajuela, Costa Rica ||  || 1–2 || 1-5 || Friendly
|-
| 6. || April 2, 2003 || Brígido Iriarte, Caracas, Venezuela ||  || 1–0 || 2-0 || Friendly
|-
| 7. || June 7, 2003 || Orange Bowl, Miami, United States ||  || 1–1 || 2-1 || Friendly
|-
| 8. || March 31, 2004 || Centenario, Montevideo, Uruguay ||  || 0–1 || 0-3 || 2006 FIFA World Cup qualification
|-
| 9. || October 14, 2004 || Pueblo Nuevo, San Cristóbal, Venezuela ||  || 1–0 || 3-1 || 2006 FIFA World Cup qualification
|}

References

External links
Profile by FC Luzern fan site JustCantBeatThat.com
 
 International statistics at rsssf
Gabriel Urdaneta at BDFA.com.ar 

1976 births
Living people
People from Mérida, Mérida
Association football midfielders
Venezuelan footballers
Venezuela international footballers
1997 Copa América players
1999 Copa América players
2001 Copa América players
Caracas FC players
FC Luzern players
SV Waldhof Mannheim players
FC Lugano players
SC Kriens players
BSC Young Boys players
FC Vaduz players
UA Maracaibo players
Estudiantes de Mérida players
Deportivo Miranda F.C. players
Deportivo Anzoátegui players
Venezuelan expatriate footballers
Expatriate footballers in Germany
Expatriate footballers in Switzerland
Expatriate footballers in Liechtenstein
Venezuelan expatriate sportspeople in Germany
Venezuelan expatriate sportspeople in Switzerland
Venezuelan expatriate sportspeople in Liechtenstein